Günther Mund Borgs (1934 – March 27, 2011) was a competitive diver who represented Chile at two Olympic Games. At the 1948 Summer Olympics he was 26th in the 3 metre springboard. At the 1956 Summer Olympics he was 7th in the 3 metre springboard and 19th in the 10 metre platform.

His sister is diver Lilo Mund. Both of Mund's parents were also Olympic divers; Arthur Mund and Margret Borgs competed for Germany at the 1928 Summer Olympics. Günther died in a light aircraft accident on March 27, 2011 in Melipilla, Chile.

Notes

References

External links
 
  
 

1934 births
2011 deaths
Chilean male divers
Olympic divers of Chile
Divers at the 1948 Summer Olympics
Divers at the 1956 Summer Olympics
Victims of aviation accidents or incidents in Chile
German emigrants to Chile
Victims of aviation accidents or incidents in 2011